Old Barns is a community in the Canadian province of Nova Scotia, located in  Colchester County.

References
 Old Barns on Destination Nova Scotia
 Place-Names and Places of Nova Scotia: "Old Barns"

Communities in Colchester County
General Service Areas in Nova Scotia